The 1944–45 Washington State Cougars men's basketball team represented Washington State College for the  college basketball season. Led by seventeenth-year head coach Jack Friel, the Cougars were members of the Pacific Coast Conference and played their home games on campus at the WSC Gymnasium in Pullman, Washington.

In the best-of-three playoff series with Oregon, the road teams won the first two games, which were played six nights  In the deciding third game in Eugene the next night, the home team rallied from a six-point deficit at halftime to win by a basket;
 Oregon advanced to the eight-team NCAA tournament, but lost their opener by

Postseason results

|-
!colspan=6 style=| Pacific Coast Conference Northern Division Playoff Series

References

External links
Sports Reference – Washington State Cougars: 1944–45 basketball season

Washington State Cougars men's basketball seasons
Washington State Cougars
Washington State
Washington State